Esteghlal F.C. are a football club based in the city of Tehran, Iran. Founded in 1946 they have been competing in AFC Champions League since 1970 and have become one of the most successful teams in Aisa, winning two major continental trophies including two Asian cups and are ranked joint second  among all clubs across the continent in this regard. Esteghlal are by far Iran's most successful international representatives: no other teams from that nation have won Asia's premier competition more than once, or have more than two trophy wins overall.

History

1970s 
Taj F.C. entered Asian competitions in 1970.

Statistics

By season 

 Information correct as of 15 February 2021.
 Key

Pld = Played
W = Games won
D = Games drawn
L = Games lost
FF = Goals for
GA = Goals against
Grp = Group stage
GS2 = Second group stage

R1 = First round
R2 = Second round
R3 = Third round
R4 = Fourth round
R32 = Round of 32
R16 = Round of 16
QF = Quarter-finals
SF = Semi-finals

Key to colours and symbols:

By competition

See also 

 List of Esteghlal F.C. records and statistics
 List of Esteghlal F.C. honours
 List of Esteghlal F.C. seasons

Footnotes

References

Bibliography 

 

Esteghlal F.C.